Rensselaer station is an Amtrak station in Rensselaer, Indiana, served by the Cardinal.

History

A small shelter at Rensselaer was built in 1981 and maintained by the local Lions Club. The former Monon Railroad station was demolished in 1981.

A new accessible concrete platform was constructed with funds from the 2009 stimulus bill. The platform, which cost around $500,000, was dedicated on April 20, 2011. The 1979-built shelter was later demolished and replaced with a one-story brick building, which opened on August 21, 2013.

References

External links

Rensselaer Amtrak Station (USA RailGuide -- TrainWeb)

Amtrak stations in Indiana
Transportation buildings and structures in Jasper County, Indiana
1981 establishments in Indiana
Former Monon Railroad stations
Railway stations in the United States opened in 1981